This article is a list of chapters in the Yu-Gi-Oh! 5D's manga series, written by Masahiro Hikokubo and illustrated by Masashi Sato. It was published by Shueisha and was serialized by V-Jump starting on August 21, 2009. The first volume, collecting the initial eight chapters, was released on April 30, 2010. Eight further volumes followed before the series concluded. It is one of several Yu-Gi-Oh! spin-off titles to have been serialised in V-Jump magazine and is based on the anime of the same name.

Much like the preceding Yu-Gi-Oh! GX manga, the narrative of Hikokubo's series differs from the Yu-Gi-Oh 5D's anime and features new characters alongside characters from the anime.

Volumes list

References

Yu-Gi-Oh! 5D's
5D's